Wu Haiyan (born 26 February 1993) is a Chinese footballer who currently plays for Shandong Xiangshang in the Chinese Women's Super League.

International career
On 10 February 2020, Wu Haiyan scored a goal in a match with Chinese Taipei.

International goals

See also
 List of women's footballers with 100 or more caps

References

External links 
 
 

1993 births
Living people
Chinese women's footballers
China women's international footballers
2015 FIFA Women's World Cup players
Footballers at the 2016 Summer Olympics
Sportspeople from Hangzhou
Women's association football defenders
Footballers at the 2014 Asian Games
Olympic footballers of China
Footballers at the 2018 Asian Games
Asian Games silver medalists for China
Asian Games medalists in football
Medalists at the 2018 Asian Games
Chinese expatriate sportspeople in South Korea
2019 FIFA Women's World Cup players
FIFA Century Club
Footballers at the 2020 Summer Olympics